Resisposse is a Finnish hip hop group, formed in the 2000s in Helsinki. All members of the group suffer from mental conditions. Their songs feature themes like coping with severe autism in daily life and extraordinary individuals' relationship to society. One of the main messages of their lyrics is that nobody should be bullied or discriminated against because of being different.

Kalle Havumäki
The lead member of Resisposse is Kalle Havumäki. His mother is the news anchor of Yleisradio, Marjukka Havumäki.

Havumäki gained publicity in 2006, when he performed in the Buusteri TV show on national television. The clip was uploaded to YouTube and soon it became an internet phenomenon with many humorous remix videos. Havumäki suffered from bullying in school and even pondered to quit his career as a hip hop artist. Together with his family Havumäki tried to get the videos off the internet, without success. Some time after this Havumäki gave out an exclusive interview, now saying that he's not offended by the humour built around him in the internet and that he finds it rather flattering.

In the spring of 2010 Havumäki once again became the center of attention in the media when he was denied access to a restaurant called Hemingway's, due to him being mentally and physically disabled. The restaurant later apologized and claimed that Havumäki was mistaken for someone highly intoxicated, since he had stumbled on the restaurant's door. The Finnish Association of People with Physical Disabilities strictly considered the action discrimination against disabled people.

References

External links
 Resonaari: Resisposse

Finnish hip hop groups